The Shanghai International Circuit is a motorsport race track, situated in the Jiading District, Shanghai. The circuit is best known as the venue for the annual Chinese Grand Prix which was hosted from 2004 to 2019 and was scheduled again from 2024 onwards, but its race was cancelled due to COVID-19 pandemic.

History
Shanghai International Circuit was conceived by the Shanghai authorities as a way to showcase the city to the world. A 5.3 sq km site was chosen in the Jiading District in the north west of the city, close to major car parts manufacturing facilities and a budget of 2.6 billion yuan ($450 million) raised through a government-funded joint-venture company, the Shanghai Jiushi Group.

Herman Tilke was chosen to design the track and associated buildings, and between April and May 2003, engineers visited the site to draw up their plans. The site was actually a swampland, previously used as rice paddy fields, and extensive groundworks had to be completed to construct the circuit. For 18 months some 3,000 workers were on site daily to complete the facility – a remarkable feat of both engineering and logistics.

When it opened, visitors found a vast complex, dominated by the main grandstand and pit complex, which featured wing-like viewing platforms crossing the circuit at either end. This can hold 30,000 spectators alone, and others around the circuit take the total capacity to 200,000.  Paddock facilities were also unique – each of the F1 teams had its own building, arranged like pavilions in a lake to resemble the ancient Yu Garden in Shanghai.

The Shanghai International Circuit is the first in China to be purpose-built for Formula One and it hosts FIA Formula One World Championship Chinese Grand Prix every year since 2004. The circuit also holds a number of global high-profile series, including the FIA World Endurance Championship and the Blancpain GT Series Asia.

In the past, the circuit has hosted the MotoGP world championship, and a one-off V8 Supercars China Round of the Australian-based V8 Supercar championship in 2005, 
and also the final round of the A1 Grand Prix in 2006/2007.

Layout

The track layout was inspired from the Chinese character shang (上), the first character in the name of the city Shanghai , meaning "above" or "ascend".

There’s a unique start to the lap as the drivers fly into the ever-tightening Turns 1 and 2, before they dart left through 3 and 4. The super-high g force Turns 7 and 8 are loved by the drivers, while the circuit also features one of the longest straights on the calendar, the  stretch that separates turns 13 and 14.

A lap in a Formula One car

One and two are far more difficult – a lift on entry followed by various taps of the throttle and brakes are needed so the car maintains balance throughout. It also becomes blind towards the middle of the corner. Three and four are less complicated, with three being a simple hairpin, but  a good exit is needed from four to gain speed down the following straight and through turn 5. The complex of turns 1–4 makes up the first of two "snails" on the circuit, the other being turns 11–13. Turn 6 is a second gear, right-handed hairpin with plentiful run-off. Turns 9 and 10 immediately follow – two slow left-handers which require a good exit to gain speed down the next straight. Turns 11 and 12 effectively make up a slow left-right chicane where the use of kerbs are important but traction is low. Turn 13 is a very long right-hander which becomes less and less tight, and a very good exit is important as DRS is available down the following straight. At , it is the equivalent to 11 football pitches laid end to end, or the same length as three and a half of the world's biggest aircraft carriers Turn 14 is a hairpin at the end of the straight – the second gear corner is a prime overtaking spot as DRS is available in the run up to the corner. Turn 16 is the last corner – a fourth-gear left-hander which requires a quick tap on the brakes – braking early can be more effective as you can then carry more speed through the corner and then down the pit straight.

Events

 Current

 September: Lamborghini Super Trofeo Asia
 October: Porsche Carrera Cup Asia

 Former

 A1 Grand Prix (2006–2008)
 Asian Le Mans Series (2014, 2018–2019)
 F3 Asian Championship (2018–2019)
 F4 Chinese Championship (2015–2019)
 FIA World Endurance Championship 4 Hours of Shanghai (2012–2019)
 Formula One Chinese Grand Prix (2004–2019)
 Formula Renault AsiaCup (2004–2011, 2013–2018)
 Formula BMW Pacific (2004–2008)
 Grand Prix motorcycle racing Chinese motorcycle Grand Prix (2005–2008)
 GT World Challenge Asia (2017–2019)
 GP2 Asia Series (2008)
 TCR Asia Series (2016–2019, 2021)
 TCR International Series (2015)
 V8 Supercars V8 Supercars China Round (2005)
 World Touring Car Championship FIA WTCC Race of China (2012–2016)

Records

Michael Schumacher's race lap record of 1:32.238 has stood since 2004. In Q3 of 2018 Chinese Grand Prix, Sebastian Vettel qualified on pole position with a time of 1:31.095, a new track record. The fastest official race lap records at the Shanghai International Circuit are listed as:

Gallery

Notes

References

External links

 
Shanghai International Circuit | JUSSEVENT
Shanghai International Circuit at Official Formula 1 website
Map and circuit history at RacingCircuits.info
Ciro Pabón's Racetracks 3D views and virtual laps of all F1 circuits, including this one, via Google Earth
Shanghai International Circuit on Google Maps (Current Formula 1 Tracks)

Formula One circuits
Grand Prix motorcycle circuits
Chinese Grand Prix
Sports venues in Shanghai
Motorsport venues in Shanghai
A1 Grand Prix circuits
Former Supercars Championship circuits
World Touring Car Championship circuits
Racing circuits designed by Hermann Tilke